The Melbourne Jazz Fringe Festival is an annual international jazz festival held in Melbourne, Australia in April or May. The festival was formed in 2005 to celebrate Melbourne’s burgeoning creative jazz scene. Building on the unprecedented success of the 2005, 2006, and 2007 festivals, the festival returns again in 2008 to deliver eleven days and nights of original music featuring Melbourne’s most celebrated improvisers plus interstate guests.

Each year the festival begins in Federation Square on the big outdoor stage with a free concert, continues throughout the week with many innovative events including the Jazz Fringe Commission Concert at BMW Edge, and finally winds up with Big Arse Sunday. ‘Big Arse’ has become one of the ‘not to be missed’ events on Melbourne’s musical calendar.

Major sponsors include Victoria University, Big Trousers, APRA, Federation Square, Arts Victoria 2008.

Artist lineups

Melbourne Jazz Fringe Festival 2006
Adam Simmons Quartet, Andrea Keller Quartet, Andrew Swann Group, Anita Hustas Trio, Ball/Magnusson/Talia, Barnett/Lee/Hendry Trio, Lawrence Folvig/Eamon McNelis Duo, Big Fela, Bone Clan
Boundaries Band, The Boys, BUM - Bohjass Upas Militia, BYAR, Charles St Trio, Erik Griswold, Fallingwater Trio, Fran Swinn, Gideon Brazil, The Hoodangers, Hughes/Ferella/Hannaford, Jamie Oehlers and Sam Keevers, Jamie Oehlers and Julien Wilson, Joanne Cannon, Julien Wilson Trio, Keller, Murphy & Browne, Kynan Robinson's Escalators, MAG Solo guitar, Murphy's Law, The New Willow Neilson Quintet, Paper Hat Conversations, Phil Noy Quartet, Stephen Grant, Tim Pledger Trio, Tony Gorman (Sydney) - Songs of Hope, 12 Tone Diamonds, Ren Walters Group, Wanders/Simmons/Brown/Baxter and Zeno's Wig.

Melbourne Jazz Fringe Festival 2007
20th Century Dog (Sydney), Anita Hustas Trio ‘Anemone’, Andrea Keller Quartet, Allan Browne’s Drunken Boat, Bennetts Lane Big Band, Bumford, Byar Gamelan Orchestra, Colin Hopkins, Craig Fermanis Trio
Erik Griswold (Brisbane/USA), Elana Stone/Stephen Magnusson/Julien Wilson, Fran Swinn Trio, Frock. Falling Water, Gerard Masters Trio (Sydney), Gian Slater Band, Hannaford/Tinkler/Shaw-Reynolds, Harrow, Jex Saarelaht Trio, Mark Shepherd, Marinucci/Di Sario/Archer, Meter Maid, Nooks and Crannies curated by Phil Bywater, Monopod, Myles Mumford, New Blood, Michelle Nicolle Quartet, The Natives,
Nathan Slater Ensemble, Peter Knight’s 5+2 Brass Ensemble, Rabid Hawk, Ren Walters’ Tip, Simon Barker, Silo String Quartet, Sam Keevers, Stephen Magnusson Trio, Scott Tinkler, Trio Apoplectic (Sydney), Tim Pledger Trio, Tristram Williams’ Diode, Twelve Tone Diamonds, Tzigas, Vada, Vanessa Tomlinson (Brisbane) and Whitesploitation.

Melbourne Jazz Fringe Festival 2008
Allan Browne’s ‘Freejazz’, Anthony Schulz /Anita Hustas, Antripodean Collective, Ben Carr Trio, Ben Winkelman Trio, Big Fela, Bohjass, Dave Brown’s ‘Candlesnuffer’, Chris Hale/Gian Slater, Erik Griswold’s ‘Ecstatic Music’, Eugene Ball/Geoff Hughes Duo, Flap!, Harmless, Jacq Gawler Band, Joe Talia Solo, Kate Vigo Orchestra, Kynan Robinson’s ‘Escalators’, Marc Hannaford, Matt Keegan Trio, Megan Washington/Paul Grabowsky, Ok Ok Ok, Spontaneous Acts of Provocation, Stephen Magnusson/Frank Di Sario, Peter Knight, Peter Rechniewski Essay Launch, Ren Walters’ ‘this ENSEMBLE’, Rob Vincs Trio, The Snappers, The Twoks, Victoria University Showcase and Zoe and the Buttercups.

Melbourne Jazz Fringe Festival 2009
Andrea Keller,  Geoff Hughes, Kenny Weir,  Gian Slater, Dead Ants Rainbow (Troy Naumoff, Mat Blackwell, Freya Hollick, Lachlan Ewbank,  Julius Millar, Will Neal, Angus Leslie),  Adam Simmons/Brian O’Dwyer, Chris Young/Tom Fryer/Ted Vining, Lloyd Honeybrook/Sean Baxter, Pi O,  Andrew Lindsay, Allan Browne, David Rex, Sonja Horbelt, Steven Grant, Tamara Murphy, Zoe Frater Quintet, Alcohotlicks, The Gravikords, Sam Price, Tim Wilson, Noriko Tadano & Gerry Hale.

Awards

Atlantis award
This award is sponsored by Atlantis Sound and comprises one day of recording with producer/engineer Myles Mumford at Atlantis Sound Studios. It is awarded to an artist who has displayed consistent originality in producing intelligent music making. The Atlantis Award is not open to nominations by the public or by artists, rather it is awarded by the MJFF Board.

Venues 
The Melbourne Jazz Fringe features a series of performances at venues including Bar Open, Lebowski’s, Bennetts Lane Jazz Club, Café 303, La Mama and the Northcote Uniting Church; all of which are venues committed to nurturing Melbourne’s creative music scene.

References

External links

Melbourne Jazz Fringe Festival Official Website
Melbourne Jazz Fringe Festival Official Myspace
Jazz Victoria
Jazz Australia

Jazz festivals in Australia
Music festivals in Melbourne